K. Rangaraj  is an Indian film director and screenwriter and producer who was active in Tamil cinema mainly in the 1980s.

Career
Rangaraj was born in a village near Kovilpatti. While searching for job in Chennai, he decided to join Tamil film industry after being influenced by films directed by K. Balachander. He struck friendship with M. G. Vallabhan who introduced him to Bharathiraja. Rangaraj who went to assist Bharathiraja in various films made his directorial debut with Nenjamellam Nee in 1983. The film became successful and Rangaraj went on to direct successful films like Unnai Naan Sandhithen (1984), Udhaya Geetham (1985) Geethanjali (1985) and Paadu Nilave (1987). However subsequent failures like Dharmam Vellum (1989) and Ellaichami (1992) which he also produced led him in a financial crunch which also led him to leave films completely and directed serials for sometime.

Filmography
Films
Nenjamellam Neeye (1983)
Ponnu Pudichirukku (1984)
Nilavu Suduvathillai (1984)
Unnai Naan Santhithaen (1984)
Udaya Geetham (1985)
Geethanjali (1985)
Amutha Gaanam (1985)
Uyire Unakkaga (1986)
Manithanin Marupakkam (1986)
Unakkaagave Vaazhgiren (1986)
Sathya Jyothi (1986; Kannada)
Paadu Nilave (1987)
Ninaive Oru Sangeetham (1987)
Gramatthu Minnal (1987)
Dharmam Vellum (1989)
Sivaranjani (1991)
Ellaichami (1992)

Television
Kudumbam (Sun TV)
Aarathi (Raj TV)
Bhandham (Sun TV)
 Mahalakshmi (Sun TV)

References

External links
 

Indian film directors
Kannada film directors
Tamil film directors
Tamil screenwriters
20th-century Indian film directors
Tamil film producers
Indian television directors
Screenwriters from Tamil Nadu
Film producers from Tamil Nadu
Possibly living people